The Reverend James Michael John Fletcher MA (Cantab.) (29 September 1852 – 23 February 1940), was an English clergyman of the Church of England, author and historian.

Education
Fletcher was educated at Derby School and the University of Cambridge.

Career
Vicar of Tideswell
Rector of Wimborne Minster 
Canon of Salisbury
Fellow of the Royal Historical Society

Publications
Distinguished Alumni of Derby School (Derby Reporter, 1872)
A Guide to Tideswell (1902)
Mrs Wightman of Shrewsbury: The Story of a Pioneer in Temperance Work (Longmans, Green & Co, London, 1906)
A Historical and Descriptive Guide to the Churches of Shrewton, Maddington and Rollestone in the County of Wiltshire by J.M.J. Fletcher and Arthur S. Robins (1920)
The Boy Bishop at Salisbury and Elsewhere (Salisbury, 1921)
The Black Death in Dorset (1923)
Notes on the Cathedral Church of St Mary the Blessed Virgin, Salisbury (Cathedral Chapter, Salisbury, 1924)
The Stained Glass in Salisbury Cathedral, in Wiltshire Archaeological Magazine vol. xlv (1930)
Old Belfry in the Close, in Wiltshire Archaeological Magazine vol. xlvii (1932)
Seth Ward, Bishop of Salisbury, in Wiltshire Archaeological Magazine vol. xlix
Dorset Worthy, William Stone, Royalist and Divine (1615-1685) (in Proceedings of the Dorset Natural History and Antiquarian Field Club volume 36)
Dorset Royal Peculiar (in Proceedings of the Dorset Natural History and Antiquarian Field Club volume 38)
Sir Thomas Dackomb, Priest, Rector of Tarrant Gunville, 1549-1567, a Dorset Bibliophile (in Proceedings of the Dorset Natural History and Antiquarian Field Club volume 44)
Century of Dorset Documents (in Proceedings of the Dorset Natural History and Antiquarian Field Club volume 44)
Trio of Dorchester Worthies (in Proceedings of the Dorset Natural History and Antiquarian Field Club volume 44)
Dorset Men in London at the End of the 17th Century (in Proceedings of the Dorset Natural History and Antiquarian Field Club volume 54)
Thomas Bennet (1924)
Incumbents of Salisbury Churches during the Commonwealth
The Plague-Stricken Derbyshire Village: or What to See in and around Eyam (1930)
Bishop Giles of Bridport, 1257-1262 in Wiltshire Archaeological Magazine vol. xlvi (1934)
Chained Books in Dorset and Elsewhere (Dorset Natural History and Archaeological Society, Vol. 35)

Editor
Fletcher edited the journal Proceedings of the Dorset Natural History and Antiquarian Field Club between 1917 and 1932.

References
Crockford's Clerical Directory (1935)
Proceedings of the Dorset Natural History and Antiquarian Field Club (1917-1935)

1852 births
1934 deaths
People educated at Derby School
English non-fiction writers
People from Tideswell
English male non-fiction writers